Choi Young-Il (Hangul: 최영일; Hanja 崔英一; born April 25, 1966) is a South Korean footballer who played as a defender.

He played mostly for Ulsan Hyundai Horang-i and represented South Korea at the 1994 and 1998 FIFA World Cup.

Honours

Club
Ulsan Hyundai
K League 1: 1996
Korean League Cup: 1995

Daewoo Royals
K League 1: 1997
Korean League Cup: 1997, 1997(Supplementary Cup), 1998(Supplementary Cup)

Individual
K League 1 Best XI: 1993, 1995

References

External links
 Legends of K-League : 최영일 
 나의 선수시절 10 : 최영일, 90년대를 풍미했던 최고의‘족쇄맨’ 
 
 National Team Player Record 
 FIFA Player Statistics
 

1966 births
Living people
Association football defenders
South Korean footballers
South Korean expatriate footballers
South Korea international footballers
Ulsan Hyundai FC players
Busan IPark players
Liaoning F.C. players
FC Seoul players
K League 1 players
Expatriate footballers in China
South Korean expatriate sportspeople in China
1994 FIFA World Cup players
1998 FIFA World Cup players
Sportspeople from South Gyeongsang Province
Footballers at the 1994 Asian Games
Asian Games competitors for South Korea